"Frenesí" is a musical piece originally composed by Alberto Domínguez Borrás for the marimba, and adapted as a jazz standard by Leonard Whitcup and others.

Background
The word frenesí is Spanish for "frenzy".

Artie Shaw recording

A hit version recorded by Artie Shaw and His Orchestra (with an arrangement by William Grant Still) reached number one on the Billboard pop chart on December 21, 1940, staying for 13 weeks, and was inducted into the Grammy Hall of Fame in 1982.

Cover versions 
Other performers who have recorded the song include: 
Julie London
Les Brown
Dave Brubeck on his 1967 album, Bravo! Brubeck!
Betty Carter
June Christy 
Natalie Cole
Ray Charles
Bing Crosby
Tommy Dorsey
The Four Freshmen
Eydie Gorme
Woody Herman
Earl Hines
Harry James
Ben E. King
Steve Lawrence 
Billy May
Glenn Miller
Anita O'Day
Perez Prado
Cliff Richard
Linda Ronstadt
Jack Emblow, 
Pat Suzuki
Frank Sinatra
Three X Sisters vocals with the Watson Orchestra
Caterina Valente
The Ritchie Family-1975, on their Brazil album.
Jesus Chino Miranda.
Vedha (composer): A song from the Modern Theatres Tamil movie Vallavan Oruvan

In popular culture
World War II flying ace Major (later Brigadier General) Thomas L. Hayes named his P-51 Frenesi after the song.  He said it was a tribute to his wife Louise, for the song they listened to; he believed the song's name translated as "Love Me Tenderly".
The Artie Shaw recording was used in the soundtrack of the 1980 film Raging Bull.
Thomas Pynchon's 1990 novel Vineland features a character named Frenesi Gates, "her name celebrating the record by Artie Shaw that was all over the jukeboxes and airwaves in the last days of the war".

See also
List of 1930s jazz standards
List of number-one singles of 1940 (U.S.)
List of number-one singles of 1941 (U.S.)

References

1940 songs
1940 singles
1940s jazz standards
Number-one singles in the United States
Grammy Hall of Fame Award recipients
Jazz compositions
Songs written by Alberto Domínguez